Mamady Diambou (born 11 November 2002) is a Malian footballer who plays as a midfielder for Swiss club FC Luzern on loan from Red Bull Salzburg.

Career
In January 2023, Diambou signed for Swiss Super League club FC Luzern on loan until the end of the season.

Honours
Austrian Bundesliga: 2021-22
Austrian Cup:2021-22

Career statistics

Club

Notes

References

2002 births
Living people
Malian footballers
Association football midfielders
2. Liga (Austria) players
Austrian Football Bundesliga players
Swiss Super League players
FC Red Bull Salzburg players
FC Liefering players
FC Luzern players
Malian expatriate footballers
Malian expatriate sportspeople in Austria
Malian expatriate sportspeople in Switzerland
Expatriate footballers in Austria
Expatriate footballers in Switzerland